Patrick Callaerts is a Belgian molecular biologist and researcher at the Katholieke Universiteit Leuven (Leuven, Belgium).  He is head of the VIB Laboratory of Developmental Genetics, KU Leuven.

Patrick Callaerts obtained a PhD from the KU Leuven in 1992.  He did a Postdoc at the Biozentrum of University of Basel in Switzerland from 1992 until 1997.  He was assistant professor at the University of Houston in Houston, Texas United States from 1997 until 2003 and 2004 until 2004. He is VIB Group leader since 2004.

His research interest is on gene circuits in Drosophila melanogaster involved in brain development as models for human neurodevelopmental disorders, ranging from transcription factors to effector genes and signaling pathways.

Visit the webpage of the Callaerts lab: https://gbiomed.kuleuven.be/english/research/50000622/50525538/

References 
 Halder G, Callaerts P, Gehring WJ, Induction of ectopic eyes by targeted expression of the eyeless gene in Drosophila, Science 267, 1788–1792, 1995

Sources 
 VIB Laboratory of Developmental Genetics

Academic staff of KU Leuven
Belgian molecular biologists
KU Leuven alumni
Living people
Year of birth missing (living people)